İncirlik is a quarter in the Yüreğir district of the city of Adana in southern Turkey, 8 km (5 mi) east of the downtown.

Governance 
İncirlik municipality was founded in 1971 and incorporated into Yüreğir Municipality in 2008. Since 2008, İncirlik is divided into four neighborhoods and each neighborhood is administered by the Muhtar and the Seniors Council. The neighborhoods of İncirlik are Cumhuriyet (pop. 1914), Hürriyet, Kemalpaşa and Yeni Mahalle.

Economy 
İncirlik's economy is mainly agriculture and manufacturing. The major institution in İncirlik is NATO's Incirlik Air Base.

Transport 
İncirlik railway station, opened in 1912, is currently served by two regional lines and one long-distance line.

Adana Metropolitan Municipality Bus Department (ABBO) has bus routes from downtown Adana to İncirlik. İncirlik Minibus Co-operative also conducts local transport from downtown.

References

External links 
 

Neighborhoods/Settlements in Adana